The 1986–87 season was the 107th season of competitive football by Rangers.

Overview
Rangers played a total of 56 competitive matches during the 1986–87 season. The team finished top of the Scottish Premier Division for the first time in nine seasons. A total of 69 points were gained from 44 games and a lead of six points over second placed Celtic.

The Souness Revolution began with the signing of England internationals, goalkeeper Chris Woods and centre half Terry Butcher. Northern Ireland international Jimmy Nicholl rejoined the club and Colin West was brought in to partner Ally McCoist in attack. In December Graham Roberts arrived from Tottenham Hotspur to strengthen the defence.

There was a disappointing start to the league campaign, losing 2–1 to Hibernian at Easter Road. Graeme Souness was sent off for a tackle on George McCluskey in the centre circle, with both teams displaying a lack of discipline at that moment.

On the penultimate day of the season the Championship was secured at Pittodrie with a 1–1 draw against Aberdeen. A Terry Butcher header was enough to bring the league title back to Ibrox for the first time since 1978. 

In the cup competitions, Rangers were knocked out of the Scottish Cup in the third round, losing 1–0 at Ibrox to Hamilton Academical. The goal ended a run of 1196 minutes without conceding – a British record for goalkeeper Chris Woods.

They won the League Cup, defeating Celtic 2–1 with goals from Ian Durrant and Davie Cooper. This was an early success for Graeme Souness and helped pave the way towards the Championship.

The European campaign was moderately successful. Rangers reached the third round of the UEFA Cup after beating Ilves Tampere and Boavista before being knocked out by Borussia Mönchengladbach on the away goals rule.

Transfer

In

Out

Results
All results are written with Rangers' score first.

Scottish Premier Division

UEFA Cup

Scottish Cup

League Cup

*Rangers won the match 5–4 on penalties

Glasgow Cup

Appearances

League table

See also
 1986–87 in Scottish football
 1986–87 Scottish Cup
 1986–87 Scottish League Cup
 1986–87 UEFA Cup

References

Rangers F.C. seasons
Rangers
Scottish football championship-winning seasons